Whitley Wood is a suburb to the south of Reading in the English county of Berkshire.

Geography
Whitley Wood is bounded to the north by an ill-defined boundary with the suburb of Whitley, to the east by a ridge of high ground carrying the road to Shinfield, to the west by the valleys of the River Kennet and the Foudry Brook, and to the south by the M4 motorway.

Government
Whitley Wood lies within the Borough of Reading and all local government responsibility lies with the borough council. Whitley is within the Reading West parliamentary constituency.

References

Suburbs of Reading, Berkshire